The Minnesota Orchestra is an American orchestra based in Minneapolis, Minnesota. Founded originally as the Minneapolis Symphony Orchestra in 1903, the Minnesota Orchestra plays most of its concerts at Minneapolis's Orchestra Hall.

History

Emil Oberhoffer founded the orchestra as the Minneapolis Symphony Orchestra in 1903, and it gave its first performance on November 5 of that year in Minneapolis's Exposition Building. In 1968, the orchestra changed its name to the Minnesota Orchestra. It makes its home in downtown Minneapolis at Orchestra Hall, which was built for the ensemble in 1974. The orchestra's previous hall, starting in 1929, was Northrop Memorial Auditorium on the University of Minnesota's Minneapolis campus.

Financial concerns
In 2007 the Minnesota Orchestra's assets began declining, a trend exacerbated by the financial crisis of 2007–2008. In August 2008, the Minnesota Orchestra Association's invested assets totaled $168.5 million, 13% less than the $192.4 million the Association had projected in its 2007 Strategic Plan. In fiscal year 2009, the Minnesota Orchestra's board "sold $28.7 million in securities at a nearly $14 million loss".

During 2009 and 2010, the orchestra's board reported a balanced budget and drew on its endowment to cover operational deficits. At the time, it was trying to secure $16 million in state bonding for renovations of Orchestra Hall and Peavey Plaza. The orchestra posted operational deficits of $2.9 million in 2011 and $6 million in 2012.

2012–2014 lockout
On October 1, 2012, the Minnesota Orchestral Association (the orchestra's governing body) locked out the orchestra's musicians and canceled concerts through November 18 after failing to reach a new collective bargaining agreement. The MOA stated that spending on musician salaries and benefits was depleting the organization's endowment, and that labor costs needed to be reduced by $5 million per year. The musicians and their union took the position that the proposed cuts were so deep and draconian as to represent an existential threat to the future of the orchestra.

The entire 2012–13 concert season was canceled.   During the lockout, the musicians periodically presented concerts on their own,  In December 2012, Vänskä sent a letter to the board of directors and the musicians warning that the lockout was causing severe damage to the orchestra's reputation at home and abroad.  On April 30, 2013, Vänskä stated he would resign if the lockout continued:

 "I must make it clear that in the case Carnegie Hall chooses to cancel the Minnesota Orchestra’s concerts this November, i.e. if they lose confidence in our ability to perform … then I will be forced to resign".

After the orchestra management cancelled the concerts in question, Vänskä resigned as music director on 1 October 2013 with immediate effect.  On October 4 and 5, Vänskä conducted three final concerts with the locked-out orchestra at the University of Minnesota's Ted Mann Concert Hall, with Emanuel Ax as the guest pianist. As an encore, Vänskä conducted Sibelius's Valse Triste, where he requested that the audience withhold its applause afterward.

Post-lockout
On January 14, 2014, the Musicians of the Minnesota Orchestra announced that they had reached a collective bargaining agreement with the Minnesota Orchestra Association to end the lockout on February 1, 2014. Concerts resumed at Orchestra Hall in February. On April 24, 2014, the orchestra announced Vänskä's return as music director effective with the 2014–15 and 2015–16 seasons. In July 2017, the orchestra announced the extension of Vänskä's contract as music director through the 2021–22 season. In December 2018, the orchestra announced that Vänskä would conclude his tenure as music director at the close of the 2021-2022 season. He is to take the title of conductor laureate.

In May 2015, the Minnesota Orchestra performed in Havana, Cuba, as a result of the Cuban Thaw, becoming the first professional U.S. orchestra to play in Cuba since 1999. In August 2018, it became the first professional U.S. orchestra to perform in South Africa. In January 2022, the orchestra, Vänskä, and Elina Vähälä gave the North American premiere of the original 1904 version of Jean Sibelius's Violin Concerto. 

In December 2021, Thomas Søndergård first guest-conducted the orchestra. He returned for another guest-conducting engagement in April 2022. In July 2022, the orchestra announced Søndergård's appointment as its next music director, effective with the 2023-2024 season, with an initial contract of five seasons.

Music directors
 Emil Oberhoffer (1903–1922)
 Henri Verbrugghen (1923–1931) 
 Eugene Ormandy (1931–1936) 
 Dimitri Mitropoulos (1937–1949) 
 Antal Doráti (1949–1960) 
 Stanisław Skrowaczewski (1960–1979) 
 Neville Marriner (1979–1986) 
 Edo de Waart (1986–1995) 
 Eiji Oue (1995–2002) 
 Osmo Vänskä (2003–2022)
 Thomas Søndergård (designate, effective 2023)

Recordings
The orchestra first began recording (by the acoustical process) under Henri Verbrugghen in 1924 for Brunswick, and in the following years produced some landmark records. Among these was the first electrical recording of Mahler's Resurrection Symphony with Eugene Ormandy, who recorded extensively with the orchestra for RCA Victor in the 1930s. In the 1940s, the Minneapolis Symphony was contracted to Columbia Records and made a series of records with Ormandy's successor, Dimitri Mitropoulos. These included the premiere recording of Mahler's First Symphony.  Beginning in 1954 and continuing on through 1955, the group made the first complete recordings of Tchaikovsky's three ballets: Swan Lake, Sleeping Beauty, and The Nutcracker under the baton of Antal Doráti. In 1954, they also made the first recording of Tchaikovsky's 1812 Overture to include actual cannon fire, again under Doráti's direction. These recordings were made for Mercury Records as part of the Living Presence series.

In the 1970s, the renamed Minnesota Orchestra made a series of recordings for Vox Records under the direction of Stanisław Skrowaczewski. In the 1990s and 2000s, the orchestra recorded for the Reference Recordings label under the direction of music director Eiji Oue, winning a Grammy Award for Best Contemporary Classical Composition in 2003 with Casa Guidi. More recently Osmo Vänskä has conducted a cycle of the Beethoven symphonies and a cycle of the Sibelius symphonies, both for the Swedish label BIS. Their recording of Beethoven's Ninth Symphony, with the Minnesota Chorale, was nominated for a Grammy Award for Best Orchestral Performance in 2007, as was their recording of Sibelius's Second and Fifth Symphonies in 2012. On January 26, 2014, the Minnesota Orchestra and Vänskä won the Grammy Award for Best Orchestral Performance for their recording of Sibelius's 1st and 4th symphonies. In August 2017, the orchestra released a recording of Mahler's Fifth Symphony, starting a cycle of the Mahler symphonies. In November 2017, that recording was nominated for a Grammy Award for Best Orchestral Performance.

Discography
 Dominick Argento: Casa Guidi, Capriccio for Clarinet and Orchestra and In Praise of Music, with Frederica von Stade and Burt Hara, conducted by Eiji Oue, Reference Recordings, 2002

Summer festival
Begun in 1980 with Leonard Slatkin at the helm, the orchestra's summer festival has been known by several names, beginning with "Viennese Sommerfest," changing to "MusicFest" in 2001, and eventually reverting to "Sommerfest" in 2003. Sommerfest concerts are held at Orchestra Hall over a four-week period in midsummer. The orchestra also offers free live music on the plaza before and after each show, in genres varying from folk to jazz to polka. Slatkin was Artistic Director of Sommerfest from 1980 to 1989. Andrew Litton was the festival's Artistic Director from 2003 to 2017.  

The orchestra's "creative partner for summer programming" is Jon Kimura Parker, whom the orchestra named to the post in 2019. In July 2022, the orchestra announced an extension to Parker's summer programming contract through August 2024.

References
Notes

External links
 Minnesota Orchestra official website
 Regional and National Radio Broadcasts by Minnesota Public Radio
 Hubbard, Rob. "'I have done my part'", Minneapolis StarTribune, June 3, 2022. Interview with Osmo Vänskä on his nineteen-year career with Minnesota Orchestra.
 November 1903: Review of Minneapolis Symphony Orchestra's first concert
 Minnesota Orchestra Archives finding aid

Orchestras based in Minnesota
Arts organizations based in Minneapolis
Culture of Minneapolis
Wikipedia requested audio of orchestras
Musical groups established in 1903
1903 establishments in Minnesota